The High Fructose Adventures of Annoying Orange is an American comedy television series, created by Dane Boedigheimer and Tom Sheppard and produced by The Collective for Cartoon Network. The show previewed on May 28, 2012, and began airing regularly on June 11, 2012. Episodes are normally 11 minutes.

Series overview

Episodes

Pilot (2012)

Season 1 (2012–13)
This season premiered it's twelfth episode on May 28, 2012, The series premiered on June 11, 2012 and originally had 6 episodes ordered, then it was later changed to 15 before being changed to a final total of 30 episodes.

Season 2 (2013–14)

References

High Fructose Adventures Of Annoying Orange
The Annoying Orange